Joseph Baumgartner (November 16, 1904 in Sulzemoos – January 21, 1964 in Munich) was a German politician, representative of the Christian Social Union of Bavaria, Bavarian People's Party and the Bavaria Party.

He was a member of the Landtag of Bavaria.

See also
List of Bavarian Christian Social Union politicians

References

External links
 

Christian Social Union in Bavaria politicians
Ministers of the Bavaria State Government
1904 births
1964 deaths
People from Dachau (district)
Bavaria Party politicians
Members of the Bundestag for Bavaria
Members of the Bundestag 1949–1953
Members of the Bundestag for the Bavaria Party